Caves of Nanumanga is an underwater cave off the northern shore of Nanumanga, Tuvalu in western Polynesia. It was discovered by two scuba divers in 1986.

Legend
The discovery of the Caves of Nanumanga was made because of interest aroused by a local legend. According to this legend, there existed "a large house under the sea". The existence of this legend led to the scuba diving expedition in 1986, during which the caves were discovered. These are sometimes referred to as the Fire Caves of Nanumanga.

Sea level debates

The caves are currently submerged underneath the ocean, highlighting the profound change in sea level over time. Public controversies regarding sea level changes in contemporary Tuvalu are thus set against this background.

Footnotes

External links and sources
 History of the Tuvalu islands
 The Age (Australia), Monday 13 April 1987

Archaeological sites in Tuvalu
Caves of Tuvalu
Sea caves
History of Tuvalu
Nanumanga
Underwater archaeological sites